Eduard Ivakdalam (born 19 December 1974 in Merauke, Irian Jaya) is an Indonesian retired professional footballer. Ivakdalam normally plays as a midfielder and he is a former player for  Indonesia national football team.

National team career
Ivakdalam played for Indonesia in three tournaments; the 1996 Asian Cup, 1997 SEA Games, and the 2000 Asian Cup.

|}

Honours

Club honors
Persipura Jayapura
Liga Indonesia (1): 2005
Indonesia Super League (1): 2008–09
Indonesian Community Shield (1): 2009

Country honors
Indonesia
Southeast Asian Games silver medal (1): 1997

Individual honors
Indonesia Super League Fair Play Award (1): 2009–10

References

External links

1974 births
Living people
People from Merauke Regency
Indonesian Christians
Indonesian footballers
Indonesia international footballers
Indonesian Super League-winning players
Indonesian Premier Division players
Liga 1 (Indonesia) players
Persipura Jayapura players
Persidafon Dafonsoro players
Papuan sportspeople
Association football midfielders
Sportspeople from Papua